Roberto José Dromi (born 11 April 1945) is an Argentinian politician and lawyer, who served as Minister of Public Works of Argentina during the administration of Carlos Menem. He also served as Mayor of Mendoza between 1981 and 1982.

He was professor of Administrative law in many universities of Argentina.

References

20th-century Argentine lawyers
1945 births
Living people